POF or Pof may refer to:

Organizations
 Pakistan Ordnance Factories, an organisation producing arms and ammunition for the armed forces of Pakistan
 Patriot Ordnance Factory, an American manufacturer of firearms
 Pillar of Fire Church, a Christian organization founded in Denver, Colorado
 POF Music, a record label
 French Workers' Party (Parti Ouvrier Français), a 19th-century socialist political party in France

Other
 Plenty of Fish, an online dating service
 Premature ovarian failure, partial or total loss of function of the ovaries before age 40
 Part of Fortune, in astrology a significant point in a horoscope
 Shrink wrap, or Polyolefin shrink film
 Plastic optical fiber, a type of optical fiber used in telecommunication solutions
 Point of failure, an engineering term related to reliability studies
 Proof of funds, a statement by a bank or financial institution
 Pof, a rock-climbing term for a resin-based substance used to increase friction
 Power-over-fiber, a fiber optic cable that carries electrical power